Gaspé-Sud was a former provincial electoral district in the Gaspésie area of Quebec, Canada.  It elected members to the National Assembly of Quebec (earlier known as the Legislative Assembly of Quebec).

It was created for the 1931 election by splitting the existing Gaspé electoral district into Gaspé-Nord and Gaspé-Sud.  Its final election was in 1970.  It disappeared, along with Gaspé-Nord, in the 1973 election and its successor electoral district was the reunited Gaspé.

Members of the Legislative Assembly / National Assembly

References
Election results (National Assembly)
Election results (QuebecPolitique.com)

Former provincial electoral districts of Quebec